David Leonard Barnes (January 28, 1760 – November 3, 1812) was a United States district judge of the United States District Court for the District of Rhode Island and a party and attorney in the first United States Supreme Court decision, West v. Barnes (1791).

Education and career

Born on January 28, 1760, in Scituate, Province of Massachusetts Bay, British America, Barnes graduated from Harvard University in 1780 and read law in 1783. He entered private practice in Taunton, Massachusetts from 1783 to 1793. He continued private practice in Providence, Rhode Island from 1793 to 1802. He was United States Attorney for the District of Rhode Island from 1797 to 1801.

West v. Barnes

Barnes won the case of West v. Barnes (1791) representing himself and his wife's family after being admitted to the Supreme Court bar that morning.

Federal judicial service

Barnes received a recess appointment from President Thomas Jefferson on April 30, 1801, to a seat on the United States District Court for the District of Rhode Island vacated by Judge Benjamin Bourne. He was nominated to the same position by President Jefferson on January 6, 1802. He was confirmed by the United States Senate on January 26, 1802, and received his commission the same day. His service terminated on November 3, 1812, due to his death in Providence. He was interred at Swan Point Cemetery in Providence.

Family

Barnes married into the Jenckes family of Providence.

References

Sources
 James R. Perry, The Documentary History of the Supreme Court of the United States, 1789-1800, Volume 6, "West v. Barnes," pp. 7–27. Google Book Search excerpt
 Political Graveyard bio

External links
 

 

1760 births
1812 deaths
Harvard College alumni
Judges of the United States District Court for the District of Rhode Island
United States federal judges appointed by Thomas Jefferson
19th-century American judges
Burials at Swan Point Cemetery
People of colonial Rhode Island
United States federal judges admitted to the practice of law by reading law
United States Attorneys for the District of Rhode Island